Mills & Reeve LLP is a law firm headquartered in London. It has offices in Birmingham, Cambridge, Leeds, Manchester, Norwich and Oxford. It is the UK's 40th largest law firm measured by 2021/22 revenues. The firm has been named for a record nineteenth year running in the 100 Best Companies to Work For annual survey, one of a small number of organisations to have achieved a listing for 19 years running and the only UK law firm.

History
The firm's roots can be traced back to 1789 when the practice which was eventually to become Francis & Co was started in Cambridge by the 24-year-old newly qualified solicitor Christopher Pemberton. The original Mills & Reeve was formed in Norwich in 1880 when Henry Mills and Edmund Reeve came together to undertake the legal work arising out of the development of the tram system in Norwich.

The current Mills & Reeve practice was formed in 1987 by the merger of the Norwich-based Mills & Reeve and the Cambridge-based Francis & Co, forming Mills & Reeve Francis.

In 2013, Mills & Reeve merged with Manchester-based law firm George Davies and in 2017 merged with London firm Maxwell Winward.

In 2014, Mills & Reeve formed an exclusive "best friends" alliance with the French law firm Fidal.

Notable clients
Mills & Reeve has worked with Trinity College Cambridge since 1861 (as Francis, Webster and Riches).

Notable awards
Mills & Reeve was ranked  in the Best 100 Companies to Work For 2022 list, appearing for the 19th year in a row.

The firm was ranked as the 33rd most innovative law firm in Europe in the Financial Times' Innovative Lawyers Europe 2022. and was ranked in the Thomson Reuters top 20 UK Law Firm Brand Index 2022. Mills & Reeve has been ranked in the top four of RollOnFriday's Best Law Firms to Work At for the last six years, winning in 2018, 2019 and 2020.

References

External links 
Mills & Reeve LLP

Law firms of the United Kingdom
1789 establishments in Great Britain